Familiars is the fifth studio album by American indie rock group The Antlers. It was released on June 16, 2014, by Transgressive Records in the United Kingdom and on June 17, 2014, by ANTI- in the United States.

The album was preceded by the singles "Palace" and "Hotel".

Writing and composition
In an interview with Pitchfork Media, Silberman explained the concept of Familiars stating, "I was trying to understand attachment in this record. We get attached to our memories, to our ideas of who we are, of who other people are. There's a buildup of thoughts about something that keeps you from seeing it as it truly is. I've been trying to clear away as much attachment as possible in the way that I think and act. Part of that is revisiting the past and letting go of things that I've unknowingly held on to for a long time. Most of the time you don't even realize you're holding onto something, it's just a quiet whisper in the back. We're very good at distracting ourselves, which is a way of escaping, but there's no real way to escape yourself in the end. The more you try to escape yourself the more you'll be hideously confronted by whatever you're running away from, so I think it's better to face it head on."

Critical reception

Familiars received wide acclaim from most music critics. At Metacritic, which assigns a normalized rating out of 100 to reviews from music critics, the album received an average score of 82, which indicates "universal acclaim", based on 27 reviews. Pitchfork Media gave the album a 7.8 rating, indicating "Familiars is the latest satisfying effort from a band that continues to reward those listeners who give them the attention their elegant, secretly weird music deserves."

Track listing

Release history

Personnel
The Antlers
 Peter Silberman – vocals, guitar
 Darby Cicci - trumpet, upright/electric bass, piano, rhodes, synths, organ, vocals
 Michael Lerner – drums, percussion

Additional personnel
 Brent Arnold – cello (tracks 2, 6, 9) 
 Andrew Dunn – trombone (tracks 2, 9) 
 Timmy Mislock – guitar (tracks 5, 6) 
 Jon Natchez – trombone (tracks 4, 6, 8), euphonium, tuba, bari/tenor sax

References

2014 albums
The Antlers (band) albums
Anti- (record label) albums
Transgressive Records albums